Grallina is a genus of passerine bird native to Australia and New Guinea. It is a member of a group of birds termed monarch flycatchers.

Taxonomy

Higher taxonomy 
Long thought to be a member of the mudnest builder family Corcoracidae, the magpie-lark and torrent lark have been reclassified in the family Monarchidae (the monarch flycatchers). The two make up a lineage that split off early from other monarchs and has no close relatives within the family.

The monarch flycatchers are considered either as a subfamily Monarchinae, together with the fantails as part of the drongo family Dicruridae, or as a family Monarchidae in its own right. More broadly, they belong to the Corvida parvorder comprising many tropical and Australian passerines including pardalotes, fairy-wrens and honeyeaters as well as crows.

Species 
Two species are recognized:

References 

 
Bird genera
Taxa named by Louis Jean Pierre Vieillot
Taxonomy articles created by Polbot